"Unconditionally" is a song by American singer Katy Perry. It was released as the second single from her fourth studio album Prism (2013) on October 16, 2013, two days before the album was released. Inspiration for the song came primarily from a humanitarian trip to Madagascar that Perry made in partnership with UNICEF. Having been surrounded by what she described as unconditional love, she co-wrote it with the song's producers Dr. Luke, Max Martin and Cirkut to reflect that feeling.

"Unconditionally" is a power ballad styled in rock, backed against a bassline and percussion. Commercially, it peaked within the top ten in Bulgaria, the Czech Republic, Italy, Lebanon, and South Africa as well as the top twenty in Australia, Austria, Canada, Hungary, Poland, Slovakia, and the United States.

The single release was promoted with an Instagram-based campaign, a lyric video directed by Aya Tanimura and live performances—one of the latter, at the American Music Awards of 2013, was the center of controversy due to accusations of cultural appropriation. Brent Benacorso served as the director for the track's music video, which adopts the theme of love and uses a series of metaphors to enrich its concept.

Writing and production
"Unconditionally" was written by Perry alongside its producers Dr. Luke, Max Martin, and Cirkut. Perry denoted the song as her favorite within the record. She also mentioned that she wrote the song bearing in mind the sentiments she had felt during her UNICEF humanitarian trip to Madagascar in April 2013. Such sentiments inspired her to delve into the theme of unconditional love. She stated that, while on that voyage, Perry and her team would "go in cruisers up the mountain" to see newly constructed schools. After observing a group of children, she realized that even without social networking, they felt "pure" unconditional love towards each other.

Inspired by that situation, the song was described by Perry as approaching all forms of love. "I love this song because not only can it be a romantic, intimate song", she expounded. "But it can be about the type of love that a mother has when she sees her first child, or best friends [...] It is a transcendent love, not just relationship status." "Unconditionally" was also inspired by the acceptance of one's flaws in a relationship, which Perry believed was relatable to listeners. It was engineered by Peter Carlsson, Clint Gibbs, Sam Holland, and Michael Illbert, with assistance by Eric Eylands, Rachael Findlen, Justin Fox, and Cory Bice, at the MXM Studios in Stockholm, Sweden and Conway Recording Studios in Hollywood, California. Perry also handled vocal production. Engineering for mix was carried out by John Hanes and final mixing was helmed by Serban Ghenea at the MixStar Studios in Virginia Beach, Virginia.

Composition
At a length of three minutes and forty-eight seconds (3:48), "Unconditionally" is a pop power ballad, which is styled in the genre of rock. According to the sheet music published by Kobalt Music Publishing America, Inc. at Musicnotes.com, it is written in the key of G major. It paces at a moderately fast metronome, at approximately 129 beats per minute, while it is set at a 4/4 time signature, following a chord progression of Em–C–G–D. Perry's vocals in the track span from G to E. The track's "uncluttered" instrumentation features woodblock percussion and a "dramatic" bass line. Lyrically, Jason Lipshutz from Billboard deemed it the "most mature offering" on Prism, claiming it served as a "predicate" to Perry's 2010 single "Teenage Dream".

Release and promotion
In September 2013, Perry teased the release of the song as the second single from Prism, without revealing its title or date. However, MTV concluded that such song was "Unconditionally", which she discussed during a listening party for the record. The release was confirmed by Billboard. The track debuted on October 16, 2013 and was serviced by Capitol Records to contemporary hit radio stations in the United States on October 22. The next day, it was sent to Australian radio stations. A CD single was released in Germany on November 22— the same date it was serviced to radios in Italy. In France, imports of the CD started being sold on December 3. A remix version of the song by Johnson Somerset was featured on a compilation album entitled Songs for the Philippines benefiting those affected by Typhoon Haiyan in the Philippines.

The lyric video for "Unconditionally", directed by Aya Tanimura, was released on October 18, 2013. Set in a monochromatic pattern, it features actresses Janell Shirtcliff and Erika Linder, who appear naked. As Shirtcliff mouths the song's lyrics, which appear in white and fade slowly, Linder looks "painful[ly]" into the camera. They are only shown together by the end of the video, in which scene they look into each other's eyes. The video is different in style and approach from the song's official music video, which is retro-styled. Fans were invited to participate in an Instagram-based campaign, in which they could upload a photo of "what unconditional love meant to them", along with their story and location in order for it to appear on a "Prism map of the world".

Critical reception
Jason Lipshutz from Billboard deemed the song a "visceral ballad" capable of conveying its theme of relationships. John Walker from MTV praised the track and felt that the song could be written from the perspective of Jesus and denoted possible Christian undertones lying. Kitty Empire of The Guardian reckoned the track was "ungainly" and "adverbial"; Helen Brown of The Daily Telegraph wrote that its lyrics had "self-help lingo", although she remarked that "Perry's genuine faith in it, along with her wit and sense of fun, powers her through". Kevin Fallon from The Daily Beast regarded it as adequate for a Nicholas Sparks-adapted movie, however, he noted that Perry's vocal delivery saved the song of being "schmaltzy".

HitFix's Melinda Newman graded the track with a 'B'—she felt Perry's voice sounded "soaring", and opined that the theme of the song resonated due to Perry's vocal and overall delivery. Glenn Gamboa of Newsday thought Perry "ruined" the track, which she deemed "decent", for pronouncing the song title as "uncondiSHUNally". In his review for Prism, Jon Dolan from Rolling Stone wrote that the song "set stark revelations to torrential Euro splendor". Katie Woodard from Nouse said the song's "power ballad approach" highlights Perry's vocal performance. Trent Wolfe of The Verge, however, thought the song was part of the group of the Prism tracks that could "benefit from a preciously strummed six-string" instead of "beats and synths". Digital Spy's Robert Copsey awarded the song with a four out of five points rating, writing that Perry sounded "effortless" as compared to her peers.

Chart performance
"Unconditionally" debuted on the US Billboard Hot 100 at number 30. The next week, it moved five spots up to number 25; it further moved four spots the following week. On its fourth week, the track went to number 16 and one week later it rose one spot. It later peaked at number 14 on the chart. In doing so, it was Perry's second single to miss peaking within the top 10 of the chart. On the component charts of Billboard, "Unconditionally" enjoyed success—it peaked atop the Hot Dance Club Songs, while reaching number seven on the Adult Top 40 and number 16 on the Adult Contemporary charts. On the Pop Songs chart, it peaked at number eight. The song has sold more than 2,000,000 units in the United States; consequently it was certified double platinum by the Recording Industry Association of America (RIAA).

"Unconditionally" achieved moderate success in Oceanic regions. The song debuted and peaked at 11 on the Australian Singles Chart. It then gradually descended down the charts and has spent a total of 13 weeks, marking it as Perry's lowest spanning single in Australia. The song however received a platinum certification by the Australian Recording Industry Association (ARIA), denoting more than 70,000 copies sold. In New Zealand, the song entered at 26, where it ultimately peaked. Unable to peak higher, the song spent 10 weeks on the singles chart. It subsequently became Perry's lowest spanning and peaking single in New Zealand.

In Europe, the song performed moderately as well. It reached its highest position of number 5 in Bulgaria while having its lowest peak in Russia, at number 69. It reached number 16 on the Ö3 Austria Top 40—where it spent 12 weeks. On the Italian, German and Czech single charts, it was able to peak within the top 10, at number 6 for the first two and number 8 on the latter. In Italy, it sold more than 50,000 copies and was certified Platinum by the Federation of the Italian Music Industry (FIMI). On the French SNEP chart, it peaked at number 38, and was Perry's third single to miss the top 20 there. In the United Kingdom, "Unconditionally" reached number 25; while in Ireland it peaked at number 27. It fared better in Slovakia where it charted at number 11; in Belgium it reached numbers 49 and 26 in Flanders and Wallonia, respectively. In the Mexican Monitor Latino and Poland single chart, it managed to peak at 17 while in Netherlands, it reached number 32. The track charted at numbers 26 and 27 in Spain.

Music video

Production and release
The music video for "Unconditionally", directed by Brent Bonacorso, was filmed in London during October 2013. It was partly inspired by the costume drama films Dangerous Liaisons and Anna Karenina. During an interview with MTV, Bonacorso talked about the concept for the video. He stressed that he wanted to match the song's tone with its visual, explaining that he wanted to depict a "more mysterious, elegant and sophisticated world to live in..... less about a time period and more about creating an impression and a feeling." As the song essentially discusses the feeling of love, the video itself sees Perry amidst scenarios which indirectly refer to the power of it. The video is set in two different spaces, as Perry is found both in a snowy background and in a ballroom surrounded by dancers, which are mostly dressed in black apparel. Those settings were used to represent "different part[s] of the subconscious". The video premiered through MTV on November 19, 2013.

Synopsis
It begins with Perry, sitting on the ground while mouthing the lyrics of the song and staring at the viewer. As she finishes the first verse, the camera shifts to a ballroom, in which elegantly-dressed dancers start to dance. The song's chorus kicks in, and Perry is now found in the ballroom, in the middle of all the dancers. As the second verse begins, she has an owl on her arm, which she lets go and flies. The bird represents "something strong, free [and] powerful", according to Bonacorso, who added: "She lets it go into the world[,] and that literally [means] letting this force within her go wild. That's an important part of love[,] is that you have to let it go." The video also shows Perry, with a golden dress and cross-shaped earrings, with flames on her body. By the second repetition of the chorus, a bed gets lit on fire, which the director included to refer to love that "can burn you like an inferno". As the song reaches its climax, Perry gets hit by a car, with tiny broken debris from it shattering behind her, while she remains stationary and unharmed. This scene symbolizes the experience of true love, that changes "your world" and "hits you out of the blue". This scene cuts back to the ballroom, where Perry is surrounded by a similar explosion of "colorful" flowers, which is used to contrast the more violent nature of falling in love and the softer part of it, the "joyful and wonderful" feelings.

Live performances

On October 22, 2013, Perry first performed "Unconditionally" along with her other Prism tracks at the iHeartRadio Theater in Los Angeles, California. She also performed these songs the next day when hosting the "We Can Survive" concert along with friends Bonnie McKee, Kacey Musgraves, Sara Bareilles, Ellie Goulding, and duo Tegan and Sara at the Hollywood Bowl in Los Angeles. Perry also performed the song on the Australian version of The X Factor on October 28, 2013, alongside "Roar" and also performed it on the Australian breakfast program Sunrise that day. On November 10, 2013, she performed "Unconditionally" at the 2013 MTV Europe Music Awards. She also opened the American Music Awards of 2013 on November 24, 2013, with a geisha-inspired performance of the song. On December 5, 2013, Perry performed the song on the Italian X Factor. On December 13, 2013, Perry also performed the song on The Voice of Germany together with four contestants of the show. On December 14, 2013, Perry performed "Unconditionally" at the NRJ Music Awards 2014. She also performed "Unconditionally" on the season 10 finale of The X Factor (UK) on December 15, 2013. Perry performed a stripped-down version of the song on the December 20, 2013 episodes of The Ellen DeGeneres Show and Alan Carr: Chatty Man.

Controversy
The performance of "Unconditionally" at the American Music Awards led to accusations of cultural appropriation and racism from Asian-American groups and media outlets from the Wall Street Journal to Psychology Today for Perry dressing up as a geisha during the performance. Her stylist and America's Next Top Model creative director Johnny Wujek explained later "Katy and I both love Japan..... The people are so kind, there's so much there visually" then described his process of finding authentic kimono then cutting them up according to his own inspirations. Lady Gaga defended her, stating: "I think people are generally too sensitive and they should just leave her be".

Credits and personnel
Vocals: Katy Perry
Songwriting: Katy Perry, Lukasz Gottwald, Max Martin, Henry Walter
Production: Dr. Luke, Max Martin, Cirkut
Credits adapted from Prism album liner notes.

Track listing
CD
"Unconditionally" – 3:48
"Unconditionally" (instrumental) – 3:48

Charts

Weekly charts

Year-end charts

Certifications

Release history

See also
 List of Billboard Dance Club Songs number ones of 2014

References

Songs written by Katy Perry
Song recordings produced by Dr. Luke
Song recordings produced by Max Martin
Songs written by Max Martin
Katy Perry songs
2013 songs
Song recordings produced by Cirkut (record producer)
2013 singles
2010s ballads
Pop ballads
Capitol Records singles